The Evangelical Reformed Church of the Canton Bern-Jura-Solothurn is a Reformed state church in three cantons of Switzerland.  It is located within the Canton of Bern, Canton of Jura, and Canton of Solothurn.

The official worship language are German and French. Languages during church services are Czech, French, German, Hungarian, Italian, Korean and Slovak.
The denomination has a Presbyterian-Synodal church government.

In 2004 it had 745,000 members, 230 parishes, and 1,000 house fellowships. Women ordination is allowed.
Blessing of same-sex unions is allowed.

Congregations−parishes
Congregations can be found in: 

Aarberg
Aarwangen
Adelboden
Affoltern im Emmental
Aeschi - Krattigen
Aetingen-Mühledorf
Amsoldingen
Arch
Bargen
Bätterkinden
Beatenberg
Belp
Belpberg
Bern
Gesamtkirchgemeinde 
Bern-Bethlehem
Bern-Bümpliz
Bern City-Kirche
Bern-Frieden
Bern Heiliggeist
Bern Inselspital Seelsorge
Bern-Johannes
Bern Offene Heiliggeistkirche
Bern-Markus
Bern-Matthäus
Bern-Münster
Bern-Nydegg
Bern-Paulus
Bern - Paroisse française
Bern-Petrus
Biberist-Gerlafingen
Biel-Bienne
Biglen-Landiswil
Bleienbach
Blumenstein
Bolligen
Boltigen
Brienz
Buchen
Buchholterberg
Burgdorf
Büren an der Aare
Bürglen
Diemtigen
Diessbach
Diesse
Dürrenroth
Eggiwil
Eriswil
Erlach-Tschugg
Erlenbach
Frauenkappelen
Ferenbalm
Frutigen
Gadmen
Gampelen-Gals
Gerzensee
Goldswil
Gottstatt
Grafenried
Fraubrunnen
Grenchen-Bettlach
Grindelwald
Grossaffoltern
Grosshöchstetten
Gstaad-Saanen
Gsteig bei Gstaad
Gsteig-Interlaken
Guggisberg
Gurzelen - Seftigen
Guttannen
Habkern
Hasle bei Burgdorf
Heimberg
Heimiswil
Herzogenbuchsee
Hilterfingen
Hindelbank
Huttwil
Innertkirchen
Ins
Interlaken Ost Pfarrkreis Matten-Interlaken
Ittigen
Jegenstorf
Kallnach-Niederried
Kandergrund-Kandersteg
Kappelen-Werdt
Kehrsatz
Kerzers
Kirchberg
Kirchdorf
Kirchlindach Köniz
Kirchenkreis Köniz
Kirchenkreis Liebefeld Köniz
Kirchenkreis Oberwangen Köniz
Kirchenkreis Schliern
Köniz
Kirchenkreis Spiegel
Köniz
Kirchenkreis Wabern
Konolfingen
Koppigen
Krauchthal
La Ferrière
La Neuveville
Langenthal
Langnau
Lauenen
Laupen
Lauperswil
Lauterbrunnen
Leissigen-Därligen
Lengnau
Lenk
Leuzigen
Ligerz
Limpach
Linden
Lotzwil
Lüsslingen
Lützelflüh
Lyss
Madiswil
Meikirch
Meiringen
Melchnau
Messen
Mühleberg
Münchenbuchsee - Moosseedorf
Münchenwiler-Clavaleyres
Münsingen
Muri-Gümligen
Neuenegg
Nidau
Niederbipp
Niederried
Nods
Oberbalm
Oberbipp
Oberburg
Oberdiessbach
Oberwil b. Büren
Ostermundigen
Grandval
Moutier
Court
Bévilard
Reconvilier
Tavannes
Tramelan et Sornetan
Pilgerweg Bielersee
Radelfingen
Rapperswil-Bangerten
Reichenbach
Reutigen
Riggisberg-Rüti
Ringgenberg
Roggwil
Rohrbach
Rondchâtel
Röthenbach
Rüderswil
Rüegsau
Rüeggisberg
Rüschegg
Rüti bei Büren
Saanen-Gstaad
Saint-Imier - Ergüel
Schangnau
Schlosswil-Oberhünigen
Schüpfen
Schwarzenburg
Schwarzenegg
Seeberg
Seedorf
Signau
Sigriswil
Siselen-Finsterhennen
Sonceboz-Sombeval
Solothurn
Sornetan
Spiez
Sumiswald
Sutz-Lattrigen
Steffisburg
Stettlen
Täuffelen
Tavannes
Thierachern
Thun
Gesamtkirchgemeinde
Thun
Lerchenfeld
Thun
Schönau
Thun
Stadt
Thun Strättligen
Thunstetten
Thurnen
Toffen
Trachselwald
Tramelan
Trub im Emmental
Trubschachen
Twann-Tüscherz
Unterseen
Ursenbach
Urtenen-Schönbühl
Utzenstorf
Vauffelin
Vechigen
Vinelz
Walperswil-Bühl
Walkringen
Walterswil
Wangen an der Aare
Wasen
Wasseramt
Wattenwil
Wichtrach
Wimmis
Wohlen bei Bern
Worb
Wynau
Wynigen
Wyssachen
Zimmerwald
Zollikofen
Zweisimmen

Districts
Reformed Church districts include:

Bern-Mittelland-Nord 
Bern-Mittelland-Süd
Bern-Stadt 
Frutigen-Niedersimmental 
Interlaken-Oberhasli 
Jura (Arrondissement) 
Oberaargau  
Oberemmental  
Obersimmental-Saanen
Seeland 
Thun  
Unteres Emmental

External links

References 

Bern
Canton of Bern
Canton of Jura
Canton of Solothurn
Reformed churches in Bern